The 2022 LBL Play-offs was the tournament to determine the Latvian Basketball League champions for the 2021–22 season. All participating teams spent the regular season in Latvian-Estonian Basketball League, with the top six Latvian teams advancing to the LBL play-offs. The play-offs began on 13 April.

Format 
All six Latvian teams participated in 2021–22 Latvian–Estonian Basketball League regular season, determining seeding for the play-offs. Top two teams qualified for semi-finals, but other four teams started the play-off with quarterfinal series. Ouarterfinal, semifinal and bronze medal series are played in the best-of-five format, but final is played in the best-of-seven series.

Teams

Venues and locations

Personnel and sponsorship

Seeding

Play-off bracket

Quarter-finals 
The quarter-finals are best-of-five series.

Valmiera Glass ViA vs. Latvijas Universitāte

Ogre vs. Liepāja

Semi-finals 
The semi-finals are best-of-five series.

Ventspils vs. Ogre

VEF Rīga vs. Latvijas Universitāte

Bronze serie 
The bronze medal serie is best-of-five series.

Ogre vs. Latvijas Universitāte

Final 
The Final is best-of-seven series.

VEF vs. Ventspils

Statistics 
As of May 19, 2022.

Efficiency

Points

Rebounds

Assists

Final standings

References 

Latvijas Basketbola līga
2021–22 in Latvian basketball